Samuel Symington Jones (January 16, 1880 – April 13, 1954) was an American athlete who competed mainly in the high jump. He competed for the United States in the 1904 Summer Olympics held in St Louis, United States in the high jump where he won the gold medal.

References

External links
profile 

1880 births
1954 deaths
American male high jumpers
Olympic gold medalists for the United States in track and field
Athletes (track and field) at the 1904 Summer Olympics
Medalists at the 1904 Summer Olympics
Olympic male high jumpers
Olympic tug of war competitors of the United States
Tug of war competitors at the 1904 Summer Olympics